"One Hit (To the Body)" is the opening track to the English rock band the Rolling Stones' 1986 album Dirty Work. The first Rolling Stones single to feature a Ron Wood co-writing credit with Jagger and Richards, it charted in the U.S., Netherlands and Australia. Reaching number 80 in the UK, it was their poorest charting single at the time.

Recording

Credited to lead singer Mick Jagger, guitarist Keith Richards and guitarist Ron Wood, "One Hit (To the Body)" was largely the work of Richards and Wood. Both guitarists contributed heavily to Dirty Work overall, with Wood receiving credit alongside Jagger and Richards on another three songs. A sign of Wood's heavy contribution is the song's distinctive opening of an acoustic piece. Wood used Richards' own 1967 Martin D-18 to perform the jam in an attempt to come up with a proper electric riff, but the acoustic version remained. The band is known for their use of acoustic guitars to "shadow" their electric guitars; "Brown Sugar" is a prime example. Both Richards and Wood played electric, but the solo was provided by Led Zeppelin guitarist Jimmy Page. Page's contribution was the result of a short studio session between him and Wood after Page's request to hear what the band was working on. Drummer Charlie Watts provides the song's driving beat as well as its notable cymbal opening, while Bill Wyman plays bass.

Backing vocals on the song were provided by Richards, Wood, Bobby Womack, Patti Scialfa, Don Covay, and producer Steve Lillywhite's wife Kirsty MacColl.
Recording and re-recording lasted throughout much of 1985. Two locations used were the Pathé Marconi Studios in Paris and New York City's RPM Studios.

Release

"One Hit (To the Body)" was released as Dirty Works second single on 16 May in the United Kingdom and 9 May in the United States with album mate "Fight" as its B-side. The single reached the top 30 in the US. Dirty Work has long been known as the album produced at the height of Jagger and Richards' feud during the 1980s.

Music video
One of the song's most memorable features was the music video produced in support, directed by Russell Mulcahy. Featuring the Stones in a large warehouse set, the song's title is taken literally and both Jagger and Richards are seen trading mock blows while archive footage of actual boxing matches is cut in.

Remix
A remix of the song, called the "London Mix" (clocking at 7:00), was done by Steve Lillywhite and then released on the 12" single.
 Personnel The Rolling StonesMick Jagger – lead vocals
Keith Richards – backing vocals, electric guitar
Ronnie Wood – backing vocals, acoustic and electric guitars
Bill Wyman – bass guitar
Charlie Watts – drumsAdditional personnel'
Jimmy Page – electric guitar
Bobby Womack – backing vocals
Don Covay – backing vocals
Kirsty MacColl – backing vocals
Patti Scialfa – backing vocals

Charts

Notes

The Rolling Stones songs
1986 singles
Songs written by Jagger–Richards
Song recordings produced by Steve Lillywhite
Song recordings produced by Jagger–Richards
Songs written by Ronnie Wood
Music videos directed by Russell Mulcahy